LexisNexis Quicklaw is a Canadian electronic legal research database that catalogues court decisions from all levels, news reports, provincial and federal statutes, journals, and other legal commentary. It also offers a case citator and case digests. In 2002, Quicklaw was purchased by LexisNexis and is now a subsidiary of LexisNexis Canada.

LexisNexis Quicklaw is used by law students, lawyers, and law firms in Canada to access case law, legislation, exclusive current awareness services, expert commentary and more.

In addition to research, the LexisNexis Quicklaw service also includes citation tools to help law students, lawyers, and law firms validate the authority of cases, find summaries of judicial considerations, and pinpoint references.

References

External links
 Quicklaw

RELX
Online law databases
Legal research
Databases in Canada